UTR  may refer to:
 Ukrainian Television and Radio
 Union of Translators of Russia
 Unique Taxpayer Reference, a number HM Revenue and Customs assigns each UK taxpayer
 Universal Tennis Rating, for tennis player evaluation
 Untranslated region of mRNA, in genetics

See also
 Unite the Right (disambiguation)